Mandylion is the third studio album by the Dutch band the Gathering. It was released on 22 August 1995 by Century Media Records. The record is their first album to feature vocalist Anneke van Giersbergen. The album was recorded and mixed at Woodhouse Studios in Hagen, Germany between 1 and 16 June 1995, under the guidance of Siggi Bemm and Waldemar Sorychta.

Two of the songs have quotes from popular culture inserted into them: "Strange Machines" contains a passage from George Pal's film version of H.G. Wells's The Time Machine, and "Sand & Mercury" ends with a recording of J. R. R. Tolkien reading a quote from Simone de Beauvoir.

Track listing

Disc 2, 1–3 demo recorded in June 1994 at Beaufort Studio.
Disc 2, 4–7 demo recorded in early 1995 at Double Noise Studio in Tilburg.

Personnel
The Gathering
 Anneke van Giersbergen – lead vocals
 René Rutten – guitars, flute
 Jelmer Wiersma – guitars
 Frank Boeijen – keyboards
 Hugo Prinsen Geerligs – bass
 Hans Rutten – drums

Production
Siggi Bemm, Waldemar Sorychta - producers, engineers, mixing

Charts

Weekly charts

Year-end charts

References

1995 albums
The Gathering (band) albums
Century Media Records albums
Albums produced by Waldemar Sorychta